Hongqiao Subdistrict is a subdistrict of Qidong County in Hunan, China. It was one of four subdistricts approved to establish in 2014. Through the amalgamation of village-level divisions in 2016, the subdistrict of Hongqiao has 7 villages and 9 communities under its jurisdiction, its seat is at Dingshan East Road. It is served by China National Highway 322.

Subdivisions 
The subdistrict of Yongchang had 21 villages and 9 communities at its establishment in 2014. Its divisions were reduced to 16 from 30 through the amalgamation of villages in 2016, it has 7 villages and 9 communities under its jurisdiction.

7 villages
 Dingxing Village
 Dongfu Xincun Village
 Hongqiao Village
 Matou Village
 Shangbo Village
 Taohuayuan Village
 Yunhe Village

9 communities
 Baiyun Community
 Daqiao Community
 Daxiao Community
 Jingtang Community
 Nanshan Community
 Panlong Community
 Qiyuan Community
 Shangzheng Community
 Yicheng Community

See also 
 List of township-level divisions of Hunan

References 

Qidong County
Subdistricts of Hunan